Outland's Official is the debut album by Outlandish released in 2000.

Track listing
"Intro"
"Walou"1
"Mano A Mano" (featuring Majid)
"Wherever"
"The Bond Between Us"
"Come On"
"Fatima's Hand"¹ (featuring Majid)
"CPH Moro" (featuring Majid & Creative)
"Love Joint"
"Stick 'Em Up" (N.V.)
"Ill Kebab"
"Renovadores" (featuring Majid, Acorn & Jokeren)
"Heads To The Sky"

1 Songs repeated on "Bread & Barrels Of Water"

2000 debut albums
Outlandish albums